Celeribacter baekdonensis is a Gram-negative and non-motile  bacterium from the genus of Celeribacter which has been isolated from seawater from the Sea of Japan of Korea.

References

Rhodobacteraceae
Bacteria described in 2012